Barkhan is a  village in Nawabganj of Bareilly district, in Uttar Pradesh.

References

Villages in Bareilly district